The 1956 NCAA baseball tournament was played at the end of the 1956 NCAA baseball season to determine the national champion of college baseball.  The tournament concluded with eight teams competing in the College World Series, a double-elimination tournament in its tenth year.  Eight regional districts sent representatives to the College World Series with preliminary rounds within each district serving to determine each representative.  These events would later become known as regionals.  Each district had its own format for selecting teams, resulting in 24 teams participating in the tournament at the conclusion of their regular season, and in some cases, after a conference tournament.  The College World Series was held in Omaha, NE from June 9 to June 14.  The tenth tournament's champion was Minnesota, coached by Dick Siebert.  The Most Outstanding Player was Jerry Thomas of Minnesota.

Tournament

District 1
Games played at Springfield, Massachusetts.

District 2
Games played at Allentown, Pennsylvania.

District 3
Games played at Gastonia, North Carolina.

District 4
Games played at Athens, Ohio (Ohio vs. Cincinnati and Ohio vs. Minnesota) and Minneapolis, Minnesota (Minnesota vs. Notre Dame).

District 5
Games played in Stillwater, OK.

District 6
Games played at Tucson, Arizona.

District 7
Games played at Greeley, Colorado.

District 8
Washington State (Automatic College World Series qualifier)

College World Series

Participants

Results

Bracket

Game results

Notable players
 Arizona: Don Lee, Carl Thomas
 Bradley:
 Minnesota: Jerry Kindall
 New Hampshire:
 NYU:
 Ole Miss: Joe Gibbon
 Washington State:
 Wyoming:

References

 

NCAA Division I Baseball Championship
NCAA Division I Baseball Championship
Sports competitions in Springfield, Massachusetts
Baseball competitions in Massachusetts
Baseball competitions in Pennsylvania
Baseball competitions in Nebraska
Baseball competitions in North Carolina
Baseball competitions in Oklahoma
Baseball competitions in Ohio